Chakravyuh – An Inspector Virkar Crime Thriller is a Hindi-language Indian crime thriller MX Original web series, directed by Sajit Warrier and produced by Applause Entertainment Ltd, Kailash Surendranath, Arti Surendranath and Mayavid Online LLP. The series features Prateik Babbar, Simran Mundi, Ruhi Singh, Ashish Vidyarthi, Shiv Panditt, Gopal Dutt & Asif Basra. The show is based on the story and characters created by Filmmaker/Author Piyush Jha in his third book Anti-Social Network, from his Inspector Virkar Crime-Thriller book series. The show follows Inspector Virkar who is out to solve a murder case that seems to be linked to cybercrime. The show was made available for streaming on OTT platform MX Player for free from 12 March 2021.

Cast 
 Prateik Babbar as Inspector Virkar
 Simran Mundi as Naina 
 Ruhi Singh as Sagarika Purohit 
 Ashish Vidyarthi as ACP Wagh
 Shiv Panditt as Roy
 Gopal Dutt as Dr. Sinha 
 Asif Basra as Raut
 Ravi Pandey as Kaamat
 Anjali sivaraman as IP

Episodes

Season 1

Release 
The series was made available for streaming on OTT platform MX Player for free from 12 March 2021.

Reception 
The show was critically quite successful and rose to the no.1 spot on the charts in its first week itself. India Today stated "Chakravyuh – An Inspector Virkar Crime Thriller emerges as a binge watch that unveils the horror behind the seemingly harmless world of social media.” The Quint wrote "It is a terrific show that has Prateik Babbar playing a no-nonsense Crime Branch cop Virkar. Ghastly murders, a dangerous blackmailer, the dark side of the web and social media - the series has all the elements to keep you on the edge of your seat right up until the end."

References

External links 
 
 Chakravyuh – An Inspector Virkar Crime Thriller on MX Player

2020 web series debuts
Crime thriller television series
Indian web series
Hindi-language web series